Perica Ognjenović (born 24 February 1977) is a Serbian professional football manager and former player.

He played as a forward or right winger. At one point considered to be among Serbia's brightest footballing talents, Ognjenović signed with European giants Real Madrid in his early 20s, but never became a regular there, despite winning major titles, eventually going on to have an irregular career in six other countries.

He represented FR Yugoslavia at the 1998 FIFA World Cup.

Club career

Early career
Born in Smederevska Palanka, Serbia, Socialist Federal Republic of Yugoslavia, Ognjenović's first football steps were taken with modest hometown club Mladost Smederevska Palanka where he went through all age levels before breaking through to the senior squad just short of his 16th birthday, during the 1992–93 season. At the time, the team competed in the third division, and it soon became apparent the player's skill and talent far surpassed that level of competition.

Ognjenović caught the eye of country powerhouse Red Star Belgrade, which signed the promising youngster in the 1994 summer.

Real Madrid
A series of solid performances for Red Star earned Ognjenović a move to Real Madrid on 12 January 1999 for a transfer fee of DM5 million (€2.5 million), and a reported annual salary of DM1.2 million. The contract negotiations between the player's agent Zoran Vekić and Real president Lorenzo Sanz ran very long, as the team had a surplus of forwards on its roster and had to offload 17-year-old Samuel Eto'o on a loan spell to RCD Espanyol before signing any new ones; everything was finally concluded just hours before the Spanish winter transfer window closed, and the player joined compatriot Predrag Mijatović at his new club.

Ognjenović's time in the Spanish capital was not a happy one overall: only after manager Guus Hiddink was replaced by John Toshack late into the 1998–99 season did he make his official debut with the Merengues, appearing as a second-half substitute in the Copa del Rey semifinal clash against Valencia CF (2–1 home win after a 0–6 away loss). He spent two and-a-half seasons with Real Madrid, amassing only around 30 appearances all competitions comprised – mostly from the bench – before being finally released during the summer of 2001; his only official goal came against Real Zaragoza in the 1999–2000 edition of the domestic cup (2–0 home win and on aggregate).

Journeyman years
For the following six months after leaving Real, Ognjenović could not find a team. He trained alone with a private coach until 1. FC Kaiserslautern arranged a tryout and brought him in for free on 17 January 2002, in a deal until the end of the campaign with a two-year extension option; they finished seventh in the Bundesliga and qualified for the UEFA Intertoto Cup, but the player only appeared twice.

After failing to settle in Germany, Ognjenović's next stop was China with Dalian Shide FC, where he was brought to in January 2003 by the club's coach Milorad Kosanović, who had already managed him at Red Star. He then moved on to FC Dynamo Kyiv in late November 2003, but could not earn playing time there either; the next stop was in France, as he signed in January 2005 with Angers SCO in Ligue 2.

In May 2006, Ognjenović joined Malaysian Super League side Selangor FA, signing a six-month contract– the team was sitting in last place at the time of his signing. His career settled relatively from 2006 to 2008 as he played with Greece's Ergotelis F.C. in the Superleague, although he only appeared 26 times in the league combined; the following year was spent also in the country, with lowly Kallithea FC.

Ognjenović joined FK Jagodina on 29 July 2009, returning to his homeland after more than a decade.

International career
Ognjenović made his debut for the Yugoslavia national team at only 18, in a friendly with El Salvador on 12 November 1995. The nation was suspended for the UEFA Euro 1996 qualifiers.

Subsequently, he was picked for the squad at the 1998 FIFA World Cup, appearing as a substitute in all three group stage matches as Yugoslavia exited in the Round-of-16.

Honours

Player
Red Star Belgrade
Yugoslav First League: 1994–95
Yugoslav Cup: 1994–95, 1995–96, 1996–97

Real Madrid
UEFA Champions League: 1999–2000
La Liga: 2000–01
Supercopa de España: 2001

Dynamo Kiev
Ukrainian Premier League: 2003–04
Ukrainian Cup: 2004–05

References

External links
Stats at Utakmica 

National team data 

1977 births
Living people
People from Smederevska Palanka
Serbian footballers
Association football forwards
Serbian SuperLiga players
Red Star Belgrade footballers
FK Jagodina players
La Liga players
Real Madrid CF players
Bundesliga players
1. FC Kaiserslautern players
Dalian Shide F.C. players
Ukrainian Premier League players
FC Dynamo Kyiv players
Ligue 2 players
Angers SCO players
Selangor FA players
Super League Greece players
Football League (Greece) players
Ergotelis F.C. players
Kallithea F.C. players
Serbia and Montenegro international footballers
1998 FIFA World Cup players
Serbian expatriate footballers
Serbia and Montenegro expatriate footballers
Serbia and Montenegro footballers
Serbia and Montenegro under-21 international footballers
Expatriate footballers in Spain
Expatriate footballers in Germany
Expatriate footballers in China
Expatriate footballers in Ukraine
Expatriate footballers in France
Expatriate footballers in Malaysia
Expatriate footballers in Greece
Serbia and Montenegro expatriate sportspeople in Spain
Serbia and Montenegro expatriate sportspeople in Germany
Serbia and Montenegro expatriate sportspeople in China
Serbia and Montenegro expatriate sportspeople in Ukraine
Serbia and Montenegro expatriate sportspeople in France
Serbian expatriate sportspeople in Malaysia
Serbian expatriate sportspeople in Greece
UEFA Champions League winning players
Serbian football managers
Premier League of Bosnia and Herzegovina managers
FK Zvijezda 09 managers